Thiago de Almeida Primão (born 11 February 1993 in Curitiba), known as Thiago Primão, is a Brazilian footballer who plays as midfielder for São Bento. He previously made several Brazilian Serie A appearances for Coritiba. He came from Coritiba youth team.

Statistics

Coritiba

References 

Living people
1993 births
Association football midfielders
Brazilian footballers
Brazilian expatriate footballers
Campeonato Brasileiro Série A players
Campeonato Brasileiro Série B players
Campeonato Brasileiro Série C players
Saudi First Division League players
Latvian Higher League players
Coritiba Foot Ball Club players
Foz do Iguaçu Futebol Clube players
Clube Atlético Sorocaba players
Atlético Clube Goianiense players
Ohod Club players
Botafogo Futebol Clube (SP) players
Santa Cruz Futebol Clube players
Londrina Esporte Clube players
Riga FC players
Paysandu Sport Club players
Esporte Clube São Bento players
Brazilian expatriate sportspeople in Saudi Arabia
Brazilian expatriate sportspeople in Latvia
Expatriate footballers in Saudi Arabia
Expatriate footballers in Latvia
Footballers from Curitiba